Maxim Alekseyevich Denezhkin (born 10 December 2000) is a Russian professional ice hockey forward who is currently playing with Avtomobilist Yekaterinburg of the Kontinental Hockey League (KHL).

Playing career
Denezkhin played as a youth for the Loko Yaroslavl in the Molodezhnaya Hokkeinaya Liga (MHL). He also played one game for Lokomotiv Yaroslavl in the KHL in the 2018–19 season.

Denezhkin was selected by the Edmonton Oilers in the 2019 NHL Entry Draft.

Limited to just 1 game with Lokomotiv Yaroslavl during the 2020–21 season, Denezhkin left the club in the off-season as he was traded to VHL club, HC Lada Togliatti, in exchange for Stepan Steshenko on 9 August 2021.

Following a season in the second tier, Denezhkin regained his scoring touch and returned to the KHL on 25 May 2022, after securing a two-year contract with Avtomobilist Yekaterinburg.

Career statistics

Regular season and playoffs

International

Awards and honours

References

External links
 

2000 births
Living people
Buran Voronezh players
Edmonton Oilers draft picks
HC Lada Togliatti players
Lokomotiv Yaroslavl players
Russian ice hockey centres
Sportspeople from Yaroslavl
Ice hockey players at the 2016 Winter Youth Olympics